For Richer or Poorer is a 1997 American slapstick comedy film directed by Bryan Spicer starring Tim Allen and Kirstie Alley as a New York socialite couple who decide to end their spoiled relationship. The supporting cast includes Jay O. Sanders, Michael Lerner, Wayne Knight, and Larry Miller.

Despite featuring the presence of Allen and Alley, For Richer or Poorer gained negative reviews from critics and was a box office failure, grossing $32.7 million worldwide.

Plot
After ten years of marriage, New York City millionaire socialite couple Brad and Caroline Sexton are miserable and have decided to call it quits. Their marital problems come to a head earlier that evening when Brad turns their 10th anniversary party into a real estate development pitch for a theme park he calls "The Holy Land", modeled after Biblical lore. The pitch turns disastrous when one of the display's special effects catches a guest's (who happens to be a federal judge) dress on fire.

At the same time, Brad's accountant, Bob Lachman is stealing the Sextons' millions through mismanagement and filing false tax returns. His money manipulation has caught the attention of the Internal Revenue Service (IRS), and field agent Frank Hall demands to meet Bob and Brad the following morning to bring the obligations up to date and settle the missing $5 million.

Bob arrives at the office early the following morning with a file box (likely the incriminating paperwork that could land him in jail), but leaves before Brad arrives. Though he doesn't get out in time, he manages to finally evade Brad and Hall, who has just shown up.  Bob made Brad his scapegoat, since all the tax returns that Bob committed fraud are in Brad's name.

Hearing a hint from Bob that the Sextons could be fleeing (Brad told him about the Sextons' impending divorce), Hall orders the freezing of all their assets. Brad is unable to access his money through an ATM and Caroline has her credit card destroyed at her table as she's having lunch with some friends. Brad is then informed that his accounts have been frozen, but the bank teller refuses to tell him why. At first, he thinks Caroline is responsible, until he gets Bob on the phone, who tells him that he himself is the cause of their newfound problems, as he's headed for the airport.

Gung-ho IRS Inspector Derek Lester joins Hall to serve the warrant and bring in the Sextons. As Brad exits the bank (trying to chase down his Jaguar XK8 being towed), Hall and Lester surround him at the Charging Bull on Wall Street. Brad takes out his new satellite phone to answer a call, but the trigger-happy Lester mistakes it for a gun and pulls out his own pistol, shooting it out of Brad's hand, much to Hall's chagrin.

Brad flees on foot, steals a cab and happens to pick up Caroline. The Sextons get away from Hall and Lester and the NYPD (who apprehend the agents for reckless pursuit) and leave New York. They crash the cab into a muddy swamp and are forced to spend that night sleeping rough, covered in mud. The next day, they find themselves in Intercourse, Pennsylvania, a small Lancaster County-area community of Old Order Amish. Brad drops in on a conversation and after stealing some clothes, they masquerade as Jacob and Emma Yoder, a family's (also named Yoder) expected cousins from Missouri. Samuel and Levinia, along with their sons and daughters, make the pair at home.

The pair try to fit in, and while Brad manages to adjust well, the glamorous and spoiled prima donna Caroline, deprived of her cigarettes, fine clothes, makeup, and other creature comforts, throws various childlike tantrums when she and Brad are alone. This gets noticed by Levinia and Samuel, who chalk it up to the pair having marital difficulties. Brad decides to try and relate better to Caroline after a talk from Samuel about how each day, no matter how bleak, is a gift of life from God. Gradually, both learn to fit in through their own abilities. Brad with his knowledge of real estate values, helps Samuel's future son-in-law Henner buy a plot of land, and Caroline's knowledge of fashion helps their conservative ordnung relax their colorless dress code.

The Sextons then rediscover why they fell in love in the first place, largely through their efforts of helping others rather than themselves. As Samuel and Levinia's daughter Rebecca is exchanging vows with Henner, the ceremony is interrupted by police and a drenched Hall and Lester, who crashed into the stolen cab. The Sextons are exposed and hauled back to New York to face trial. Brad's attorney Phil Kleinmann informs them that he found Bob in Zurich and had him extradited back to America. A resisting Bob is then hauled into the courtroom by uniformed officers to face the Sextons. Bob confesses, and while Brad thanks him for saving his (Brad's) and Caroline's marriage, he still knocks him out in retribution for his actions. Charges against the Sextons are dropped.

Brad and Caroline return to the Yoders to make things right, but their pleas for forgiveness seem to fall on deaf ears. As they turn to leave, Samuel informs them that he and Levinia knew the whole time of the ruse. They said they put up with it, because it was planting season and they needed the extra help. Brad offers to give his watch as a present only to be told that the Amish cannot accept gifts, only trades. He then proceeds to trade the watch for Big John, a gargantuan Belgian horse that Brad (as Jacob) tamed largely by dumb luck and some corn. Brad also tells Sam not to "open the back of the watch;" the watch seems to have in it a risque picture, which amuses him. The movie ends with Brad and Caroline driving a 1954 Ford pickup with a horse trailer hauling Big John. It is then revealed that the Sextons traded their 1997 Jaguar for the truck. In the closing credits, Brad contemplates buying the pond, where they crashed the cab and Caroline reveals she is pregnant with the couple's first child.

Cast

Reception
For Richer or Poorer was a box office flop, earning $32.7 million on an estimated budget of $35 million. Reviews of the film were mainly negative. It currently holds a 13% approval rating at Rotten Tomatoes based on 23 reviews (4 positive, 19 negative). Roger Ebert gave the film 2 out of 4 stars. Regarding the film and Tim Allen and Kirstie Alley's performances, he stated: "I admired their sheer professionalism. The plot is a yawner... But they succeed somehow in bringing a certain charm to their scenes, and they never miss with a laugh line."

At the 1997 Stinkers Bad Movie Awards, Tim Allen and Kirstie Alley were nominated for Worst On-Screen Couple but lost to Jean-Claude van Damme and Dennis Rodman for Double Team.

References

External links
 
 

1997 films
1997 comedy films
American comedy films
Amish in films
Amish in popular culture
Films shot in Baltimore
Films shot in New York City
Films scored by Randy Edelman
Films directed by Bryan Spicer
Universal Pictures films
Films set in New York City
Films set in Pennsylvania
1990s English-language films
1990s American films